Indu Kumari Sharma is a Nepali communist politician and a member of the House of Representatives of the federal parliament of Nepal. She was elected from CPN Maoist Centre under the proportional representation system. She represents Nepal Communist Party (NCP) which was formed after the  election by the merger of her party with CPN UML.

She was a candidate under the first-past-the-post system from Mahottari-4 constituency, also representing NCP Maoist Centre, in the second constituent assembly elections in 2013.

References

Living people
Nepal MPs 2017–2022
Nepal Communist Party (NCP) politicians
Communist Party of Nepal (Maoist Centre) politicians
1978 births